Badister collaris is a species of ground beetle of the subfamily Licininae that can be found everywhere in Europe except for Estonia, Finland, Moldova, Romania, and various European islands.

References

Beetles described in 1844
Beetles of Europe